Yulia Sergeyevna Lichagina (born 7 April 1994) is a Russian épée fencer. She competed in the 2020 Summer Olympics.

References

1994 births
Living people
Sportspeople from Moscow
Fencers at the 2020 Summer Olympics
Russian female épée fencers
Competitors at the 2017 Summer Universiade
Olympic fencers of Russia
20th-century Russian women
21st-century Russian women